Haviland Morris (born September 14, 1959) is an American film, television, and Broadway actress, who currently works in real estate.

Early life
Morris was born in Loch Arbour, New Jersey and spent much of her childhood in Hong Kong and Singapore. Her father worked in the electronics industry. Morris studied acting at Purchase College, where she graduated in 1982. She was also a classmate of Stanley Tucci.

Career
Haviland Morris is most famous for her role as Caroline Mulford in Sixteen Candles. She was also in Madonna's Who's That Girl (1987) and Gremlins 2: The New Batch (1990).

Morris played Karen Pruitt in Home Alone 3 in 1997 and Dr. Claire Baxter on One Life to Live from 2001–2003. She provided the voice for Michelle Payne in the popular video game Max Payne. She has appeared in three Law & Order series (Law & Order, Law & Order: Special Victims Unit, and Law & Order: Criminal Intent), as well as Sex and the City and other shows. In 2007, she appeared in the independent film Cherry Crush. In 2008, she made several appearances on One Tree Hill as a counselor.

Personal life
Morris is married to Robert Score. They have a daughter, Faith, born in 1991, and a son, Henry, born in 2000. She currently works as a licensed real estate associate broker, but occasionally makes guest appearances in television.

Filmography

References

External links

1959 births
Living people
20th-century American actresses
21st-century American actresses
Actresses from New Jersey
American film actresses
American real estate businesspeople
American soap opera actresses
American stage actresses
American television actresses